This is a list of schools in Lincolnshire, England.

State-funded schools

Primary schools 

 Alford Primary School, Alford
 Allington with Sedgebrook CE Primary School, Allington
 Ancaster CE Primary School, Ancaster
 Bardney CE and Methodist Primary School, Bardney
 Barkston and Syston CE Primary School, Barkston
 Barrowby CE Primary School, Barrowby
 Bassingham Primary School, Bassingham
 Baston CE Primary School, Baston
 Beacon Primary Academy, Skegness
 Belmont Community Primary School, Grantham
 Belton Lane Community Primary School, Grantham
 Benjamin Adlard Primary School, Gainsborough
 Billingborough Primary School, Billingborough
 The Billinghay CE Primary School, Billinghay
 Binbrook CE Primary School, Binbrook
 The Bluecoat School, Stamford
 Blyton Cum Laughton CE School, Blyton
 Boston Pioneers Free School Academy, Boston
 Boston St Mary's RC Primary Academy, Boston
 Boston West Academy, Boston
 Bourne Abbey CE Academy, Bourne
 Bourne Elsea Park CE Primary Academy, Bourne
 Bourne Westfield Primary Academy, Bourne
 Bracebridge Heath St John's Primary Academy, Bracebridge Heath
 Bracebridge Infant and Nursery School, Bracebridge
 Branston CE Infant Academy, Branston
 Branston Junior Academy, Branston
 Brant Broughton CE and Methodist Primary School, Brant Broughton
 Brown's CE Primary School, Horbling
 Bucknall Primary School, Bucknall
 The Butterwick Pinchbeck's CE Primary School, Butterwick
 Bythams Primary School, Little Bytham
 Caistor CE and Methodist Primary School, Caistor
 Carlton Road Academy, Boston
 Castle Wood Academy, Gainsborough
 Caythorpe Primary School, Caythorpe
 Chapel St Leonards Primary School, Chapel St Leonards
 Cherry Willingham Primary Academy, Cherry Willingham
 Church Lane Primary School, Sleaford
 The Claypole CE Primary School, Claypole
 Cliffedale Primary School, Grantham
 Clough and Risegate Community Primary School, Gosberton Clough
 Coleby CE Primary School, Coleby
 Colsterworth CE Primary School, Colsterworth
 Coningsby St Michael's CE Primary School, Coningsby
 Corby Glen Community Primary School, Corby Glen
 Corringham CE Primary School, Corringham
 The Cowbit St Mary's CE Primary School, Cowbit
 Cranwell Primary School, Cranwell
 Deeping St James Community Primary School, Deeping St James
 Deeping St Nicholas Primary School, Deeping St Nicholas
 Denton CE School, Denton
 Digby CE School, Digby
 Digby the Tedder Primary School, Ashby de la Launde
 The Donington Cowley Primary School, Donington
 The Donington-on-Bain School, Donington on Bain
 Dunholme St Chad's CE Primary School, Dunholme
 Dunston St Peter's CE Primary School, Dunston
 Eagle Community Primary School, Eagle
 East Wold CE Primary School, Legbourne
 Eastfield Infants and Nursery Academy, Louth
 The Edenham CE School, Edenham
 The Edward Richardson Primary School, Tetford
 Ellison Boulters Academy, Scothern
 Ermine Primary Academy, Lincoln
 Faldingworth Community Primary School, Faldingworth
 Fishtoft Academy, Fishtoft
 Fiskerton CE Primary School, Fiskerton
 Fleet Wood Lane School, Fleet
 Fosse Way Academy, North Hykeham
 The Fourfields CE School, Sutterton
 Frances Olive Anderson CE Primary School, Lea
 Friskney All Saints CE Primary School, Friskney
 Frithville Primary School, Frithville
 Fulstow Community Primary School, Fulstow
 The Gainsborough Charles Baines Primary School, Gainsborough
 The Gainsborough Hillcrest Early Years Academy, Gainsborough
 The Gainsborough Parish Church Primary School, Gainsborough
 Gedney Church End Primary Academy, Gedney
 Gedney Drove End Primary School, Gedney Drove End
 The Gedney Hill CE Primary School, Gedney
 The Gonerby Hill Foot CE Primary School, Gonerby Hill Foot
 Gipsey Bridge Academy, Gipsey Bridge
 Gosberton Academy, Gosberton
 Grainthorpe Junior School, Grainthorpe
 Grasby All Saints CE Primary School, Grasby
 Great Ponton CE School, Great Ponton
 Great Steeping Primary School, Great Steeping
 Grimoldby Primary School, Grimoldby
 The Hackthorn CE Primary School, Hackthorn
 Halton Holegate CE Primary School, Halton Holegate
 The Harlaxton CE Primary School, Harlaxton
 The Harrowby CE Infant School, Grantham
 Hartsholme Academy, Lincoln
 Hawthorn Tree School, Boston
 Heckington St Andrew's CE School, Heckington
 Heighington Millfield Primary Academy, Heighington
 Helpringham School, Helpringham
 Hemswell Cliff Primary School, Hemswell Cliff
 Hogsthorpe Primary Academy, Hogsthorpe
 Holbeach Bank Primary Academy, Holbeach Bank
 Holbeach Primary Academy, Holbeach
 The Holbeach St Mark's CE Primary School, Holbeach St Marks
 The Holbeach William Stukeley CE Primary School, Holbeach
 Holton-le-Clay Infant School, Holton-le-Clay
 Holton-le-Clay Junior School, Holton-le-Clay
 Horncastle Primary School, Horncastle
 The Horncastle St Lawrence School, Horncastle
 Huntingtower Academy, Grantham
 Huttoft Primary School, Huttoft
 Ingham Primary School, Ingham
 Ingoldmells Academy, Ingoldmells
 Ingoldsby Academy, Ingoldsby
 The Isaac Newton Primary School, Grantham
 The John Harrox Primary School, Moulton
 Keelby Primary Academy, Keelby
 Kelsey Primary School, North Kelsey
 The Kirkby-la-Thorpe CE Primary School, Kirkby la Thorpe
 The Kirkby-on-Bain CE Primary School, Kirkby on Bain
 Kirton Primary School, Kirton
 Lacey Gardens Junior Academy, Louth
 The Lancaster School, Birchwood
 Langtoft Primary School, Langtoft
 Leadenham CE Primary School, Leadenham
 The Leasingham St Andrew's CE Primary School, Leasingham
 Legsby Primary School, Legsby
 Leslie Manser Primary School, Lincoln
 Linchfield Academy, Deeping St James
 Lincoln Birchwood Junior School, Lincoln
 The Lincoln Bishop King CE Primary School, Lincoln
 Lincoln Carlton Academy, Lincoln
 The Lincoln Manor Leas Infants School, Lincoln
 The Lincoln Manor Leas Junior School, Lincoln
 Lincoln Monks Abbey Primary School, Lincoln
 The Lincoln St Peter at Gowts CE Primary School, Lincoln
 The Lincoln St Peter-in-Eastgate CE Infants School, Lincoln
 Ling Moor Primary Academy, North Hykeham
 The Little Gonerby CE Infant School, Grantham
 Long Bennington CE Academy, Long Bennington
 Long Sutton County Primary School, Long Sutton
 Louth Kidgate Primary Academy, Louth
 Lutton St Nicholas Primary Academy, Lutton
 Mablethorpe Primary Academy, Mablethorpe
 Malcolm Sargent Primary School, Stamford
 Manor Farm Academy, North Hykeham
 The Mareham-le-Fen CE Primary School, Mareham le Fen
 Market Deeping Community Primary School, Market Deeping
 The Market Rasen CE Primary School, Market Rasen
 Marshchapel Infant School, Marshchapel
 The Marston Thorold's CE School, Marston
 The Marton Academy, Marton
 The Meadows Primary School, Lincoln
 Mercer's Wood Academy, Gainsborough
 The Metheringham Primary School, Metheringham
 The Middle Rasen Primary School, Middle Rasen
 Millside Spencer Academy, East Leake
 The Morton CE Primary School, Morton and Hanthorpe
 Morton Trentside Primary School, Morton by Gainsborough
 Moulton Chapel Primary School, Moulton Chapel
 Mount Street Academy, Lincoln
 Mrs Mary King's CE Primary School, Martin
 The National CE Junior School, Grantham
 Navenby CE Primary School, Navenby
 The Nettleham CE Junior School, Nettleham
 The Nettleham Infant and Nursery School, Nettleham
 Nettleton Community Primary School, Nettleton
 The New Leake Primary School, New Leake
 New York Primary School, New York
 Newton-on-Trent CE Primary School, Newton on Trent
 Nocton Community Primary School, Nocton
 Normanby Primary School, Normanby by Spital
 The North Cotes CE Primary School, North Cotes
 North Cockerington CE Primary School, North Cockerington
 The North Hykeham All Saints CE Primary School, North Hykeham
 North Scarle Primary School, North Scarle
 North Somercotes CE Primary School, North Somercotes
 North Thoresby Primary Academy, North Thoresby
 Old Leake Primary Academy, Old Leake
 Osbournby Primary School, Osbournby
 Osgodby Primary School, Osgodby
 Our Lady of Good Counsel RC Primary School, Sleaford
 Our Lady of Lincoln RC Primary School, Lincoln
 Park Academy, Boston
 Partney CE Primary School, Partney
 The Pinchbeck East CE Primary Academy, Pinchbeck
 Pollyplatt Primary School, Scampton
 Poplar Farm School, Grantham
 The Potterhanworth CE Primary School, Potterhanworth
 The Priory Witham Academy, Lincoln
 Quadring Cowley & Brown's Primary School, Quadring
 Rauceby CE Primary School, North Rauceby
 Reepham CE Primary School, Reepham
 The Richmond School, Skegness
 The Ropsley CE Primary School, Ropsley
 Ruskington Chestnut Street CE Academy, Ruskington
 St Andrew's CE Primary School, Woodhall Spa
 St Anne's CE Primary School, Grantham
 The St Augustine's RC Academy, Stamford
 St Bartholomew's CE Primary School, Pinchbeck
 St Botolph's CE Primary School, Sleaford
 The St Faith and St Martin CE Junior School, Lincoln
 The St Faith's CE Infant and Nursery School, Lincoln
 St George's CE Primary School, Gainsborough
 St George's CE Primary School, Stamford
 The St Gilbert of Sempringham CE Primary School, Pointon
 St Giles Academy, Lincoln
 St Helena's CE Primary School, Willoughby
 The St Hugh's RC Primary Academy, Lincoln
 St Lawrence CE Primary School, Skellingthorpe
 The St Margaret's CE School, Withern
 The St Mary's RC Academy, Grantham
 The St Michael's CE Primary School, Thorpe on the Hill
 St Michael's CE School, Louth
 St Nicholas CE Primary Academy, Boston
 St Norbert's RC Academy, Spalding
 St Paul's Community Primary School, Spalding
 The St Peter and St Paul CE Primary School, Burgh le Marsh
 The St Sebastian's CE Primary School, Great Gonerby
 St Thomas CE Primary Academy, Boston
 Saxilby CE Primary School, Saxilby
 Scamblesby CE Primary School, Scamblesby
 Scampton CE Primary School, Scampton
 Scotter Primary School, Scotter
 Seathorne Primary Academy, Winthorpe
 Shepeau Stow Primary School, Shepeau Stow
 The Sibsey Free Primary School, Sibsey
 Sir Francis Hill Community Primary School, Lincoln
 Skegness Infant Academy, Skegness
 Skegness Junior Academy, Skegness
 Skellingthorpe the Holt Primary School, Skellingthorpe
 The South Hykeham Community Primary School, South Hykeham
 South View Community Primary School, Crowland
 South Witham Academy, South Witham
 The Spalding Monkshouse Primary School, Spalding
 Spalding Parish CE Day School, Spalding
 Spalding Primary Academy, Spalding
 The Spalding St John the Baptist CE Primary School, Spalding
 Spilsby Primary School, Spilsby
 Stamford St Gilberts CE Primary School, Stamford
 Staniland Academy, Boston
 Stickney CE Primary School, Stickney
 Sturton by Stow Primary School, Sturton by Stow
 Surfleet Primary School, Surfleet
 Sutton Bridge Westmere Community Primary School, Sutton Bridge
 Sutton St James Community Primary School, Sutton St James
 Sutton-on-Sea Community Primary School, Sutton-on-Sea
 Swinderby All Saints CE Primary School, Swinderby
 Swineshead St Mary's CE Primary School, Swineshead
 Tattershall Holy Trinity CE Primary School, Tattershall
 Tattershall Primary School, Tattershall
 Tealby School, Tealby
 Tetney Primary School, Tetney
 Theddlethorpe Academy, Theddlethorpe St Helen
 Thurlby Community Primary Academy, Thurlby
 Tower Road Academy, Boston
 Toynton All Saints Primary School, Toynton All Saints
 The Tydd St Mary CE Primary School, Tydd St Mary
 The Uffington CE Primary School, Uffington
 The Utterby Primary Academy, Utterby
 Waddingham Primary School, Waddingham
 Waddington All Saints Academy, Waddington
 Waddington Redwood Primary Academy, Waddington
 The Wainfleet Magdalen CE/Methodist School, Wainfleet All Saints
 Walcott Primary School, Walcott
 Washingborough Academy, Washingborough
 The Welbourn CE Primary School, Welbourn
 Welton St Mary's CE Primary Academy, Welton
 West Grantham CE Primary Academy, Grantham
 Westgate Academy, Lincoln
 Weston Hills CE Primary School, Weston Hills
 Weston St Mary CE Primary School, Weston
 Whaplode CE Primary School, Whaplode
 White's Wood Academy, Gainsborough
 William Alvey School, Sleaford
 William Hildyard CE Primary and Nursery School, Market Deeping
 Willoughton Primary School, Willoughton
 Winchelsea Primary School, Ruskington
 Witham St Hughs Academy, Witham St Hughs
 Woodlands Infant and Nursery School, Birchwood
 Wragby Primary School, Wragby
 Wrangle Primary School, Wrangle
 Wyberton Primary Academy, Wyberton
 Wygate Park Academy, Spalding

Non-selective secondary schools 

 Banovallum School, Horncastle
 Barnes Wallis Academy, Tattershall
 Bourne Academy, Bourne
 Branston Community Academy, Branston
 Caistor Yarborough Academy, Caistor
 Charles Read Academy, Corby Glen
 Cowley Academy, Donington
 De Aston School, Market Rasen
 The Deepings School, Deeping St James
 The Gainsborough Academy, Gainsborough
 Giles Academy, Old Leake
 Haven High Academy, Boston
 John Spendluffe Technology College, Alford
 King Edward VI Academy, Spilsby
 Lincoln Castle Academy, Lincoln
 Lincoln Christ's Hospital School, Lincoln
 Lincoln UTC, Lincoln
 Louth Academy, Louth
 North Kesteven Academy, North Hykeham
 The Priory Academy LSST, Lincoln
 Priory City of Lincoln Academy, Lincoln
 Priory Pembroke Academy, Cherry Willingham
 The Priory Ruskin Academy, Grantham
 The Priory Witham Academy, Lincoln
 St George's Academy, Sleaford
 St Peter and St Paul's Catholic Voluntary Academy, Lincoln
 Spalding Academy, Spalding
 Sir Robert Pattinson Academy, North Hykeham
 Sir William Robertson Academy, Welbourn
 Skegness Academy, Skegness
 Somercotes Academy, North Somercotes
 Stamford Welland Academy, Stamford
 Thomas Middlecott Academy, Kirton
 University Academy Holbeach, Holbeach
 University Academy Long Sutton, Long Sutton
 Walton Academy, Grantham
 West Grantham Church of England Secondary Academy, Grantham
 William Farr School, Welton
 William Lovell Church of England Academy, Stickney

Grammar schools 

 Boston Grammar School, Boston
 Boston High School, Boston
 Bourne Grammar School, Bourne
 Caistor Grammar School, Caistor
 Carre's Grammar School, Sleaford
 Kesteven and Grantham Girls' School, Grantham
 Kesteven and Sleaford High School, Sleaford
 King Edward VI Grammar School, Louth
 The King's School, Grantham
 Queen Elizabeth's Grammar School, Alford
 Queen Elizabeth's Grammar School, Horncastle
 Queen Elizabeth's High School, Gainsborough
 Skegness Grammar School, Skegness
 Spalding Grammar School, Spalding
 Spalding High School, Spalding

Special and alternative schools 

 Acorn Free School, Lincoln
 Aegir Academy, Gainsborough
 Ambergate Sports College, Grantham
 Athena School, Lincoln
 The Eresby School, Spilsby
 Fortuna School, Lincoln
 Gosberton House Academy, Gosberton
 The Grantham Sandon School, Grantham
 Greenfields Academy, Grantham
 The John Fielding Special School, Boston
 The Lincoln St Christopher's School, Lincoln
 The Pilgrim School, Lincoln
 St Bernard's School, Louth
 The St Francis Special School, Lincoln
 Springwell Alternative Academy, Grantham
 Springwell Alternative Academy, Lincoln
 Springwell Alternative Academy, Mablethorpe
 Springwell Alternative Academy, Spalding
 Tulip Academy, Spalding
 Warren Wood Academy, Gainsborough
 Willoughby Academy, Bourne
 Woodlands Academy, Spilsby

Further education 
 Boston College
 Grantham College
 Lincoln College
 New College Stamford
 Riseholme College
 Sleaford Joint Sixth Form

Independent schools

Primary and preparatory schools 

 Ayscoughfee Hall School, Spalding
 Bicker Preparatory School, Bicker
 Burton Hathow Preparatory School, Burton
 Copthill Independent Day School, Uffington
 Dudley House School, Grantham
 Grantham Preparatory School, Grantham
 Greenwich House School, Louth
 Handel House Preparatory School, Gainsborough
 St George's Preparatory School, Boston
 St Hugh's School, Woodhall Spa
 Stamford Junior School, Stamford
 The Viking School, Skegness
 Witham Hall, Witham on the Hill

Senior and all-through schools 
 Kirkstone House School, Baston
 Lincoln Minster School, Lincoln
 Stamford High School, Stamford
 Stamford School, Stamford

Special and alternative schools 

 Aspiration House School, Boston
 Bridge House Independent School, Boston
 Build-a-Future Independent School, West Ashby
 Castle Futures, Lincoln
 Compass Community School Lincolnshire, Osbournby
 Esland Isaac Newton School, Grantham
 Holton Sleaford Independent School, Sleaford
 Kisimul School, Swinderby
 Witham Prospect School, Norton Disney

Further education 
 First College Lincs

Lincolnshire
Schools in Lincolnshire